Anna Ilyinichna Yelizarova-Ulyanova (Nizhny Novgorod – 19 October 1935, Moscow) was a Russian revolutionary and a Soviet politician. The older sister of Vladimir Lenin and of Maria Ilyinichna Ulyanova, she married Mark Yelizarov (1863–1919), who became Soviet Russia's first People's Commissar for Transport (in office, 1917–1918).

In 2011 the State Historical Museum in Moscow put on display a 1932 letter from Anna to Joseph Stalin, in which she reveals that Lenin's maternal grandfather was a Jewish native of Zhitomir who converted in order to leave the Pale of Settlement. She asked Stalin to make this publicly known in order to counter increasing anti-Semitism in the Soviet Union at the time, but he refused and told her to keep the matter secret.

References

Great_Soviet_Encyclopedia

External links

Great Soviet Encyclopedia. Entry on Anna Yelizarova-Ulyanova 
English translation of Great Soviet Encyclopedia article

1864 births
1935 deaths
Politicians from Nizhny Novgorod
People from Nizhegorodsky Uyezd
Family of Vladimir Lenin
Russian Social Democratic Labour Party members
Old Bolsheviks
Russian untitled nobility